The 2022 season is Lion City Sailors' 27th consecutive season in the top flight of Singapore football and in the Singapore Premier League. They played in the 2022 AFC Champions League, which marked their 3rd appearance at the competition (including main play-offs), and their 1st ACL Group Stage appearance.

Squad

Singapore Premier League

U21 squad

Mattar Sailors (SFL1) squad

Women squad (LCS)

Women squad (Mattar Sailors)

Coaching staff 
The following list displays the coaching staff of all the Lion City Sailors current football sections:

Transfers

In 
Pre-season

Out 

Pre-season

Loan Returns 
Pre-season

Mid-season

Loans Out 
Pre-season

Mid-Season

Contract extensions

Friendlies

In-season friendlies

Team statistics

Appearances and goals (LCS)

Appearances and goals (Women)

Competitions (LCS)

Overview
As of 12 August 2022

Results summary (SPL)

Charity Shield

Singapore Premier League

Singapore Cup

Group

AFC Champions League

Group stage

Competition (Women)

Women's Premier League

League table

Singa Cup

League table

Note: Kaya beats Phranakorn and Persib 6-0 and 8-0 respectively while Phranakorn beats Persib 3-1

Women's National League
(Played under name of Mattar Sailors Women) 

League table

Competition (U21)

Stage 1
All 8 teams will be each other in a round robin format before breaking into 2 groups for another 3 matches. A total of 10 matches will be played thru the season.

 League table

Stage 2

 League table

Competition (U17)

U17 League

League table

Competition (SFL)

Singapore Football League D1

League table

See also 
 2011 Home United FC season
 2012 Home United FC season
 2013 Home United FC season
 2014 Home United FC season
 2015 Home United FC season
 2016 Home United FC season
 2017 Home United FC season
 2018 Home United FC season
 2019 Home United FC season
 2020 Lion City Sailors FC season
 2021 Lion City Sailors F.C. season

Notes

References 

Lion City Sailors FC seasons
Lion City Sailors F.C.
2022
1